Excelencia in Education, also referred to as Excelencia, is an American non-profit organization founded in 2004 by Sarita E. Brown and Deborah A. Santiago. It is classified as a Research Institute and Public Policy Analysis group focused on Educational Institutions. Excelencia’s stated mission is to “accelerate Latino student success in higher education.” Excelencia's research is conducted to gather information on the relationship between Latino students and their programs, and is published through Education Resources Information Center (ERIC), and educational journals, such as Insight into Diversity and Diverse: Issues in Higher Education. Excelencia regularly recognizes programs and institutions that support the Latino community through higher education. Excelencia publishes an annual list of Hispanic Serving Institutions and emerging Hispanic Serving Institutions.

History  
Brown and Santiago founded Excelencia in Education in Washington D.C. Brown is a national education policy advisor and former Executive Director of the White House Initiative on Educational Excellence for Hispanic Americans. Santiago is a higher education policy and data specialist and former Deputy Director of the White House Initiative on Educational Excellence for Hispanic Americans. Excelencia is funded through a variety of grants, contracts, events, and gifts; in 2019, Excelencia received funding from the Bill and Melinda Gates Foundation, Andrew Mellon Foundation,  Ascendium Education Group, and MacKenzie Scott

Seal of Excelencia 
Since 2019, Excelencia has offered, to higher education institutions in the United States, which "serve Latino students". The Seal acts as a certification from Excelencia that the institution helps Latino access resources like mentoring and financial accountability. Among the recipients of the Seal in 2022 was El Paso Community College, noted for its work on serving Latino communities.

Recognition 

 2021 Presidential Medal by the Association for the Study of Higher Education (ASHE)
 2019 “Modelo de la Comunidad Award” from College Board

References

Educational charities based in the United States
Charities based in Washington, D.C.
2004 establishments in Washington, D.C.
Educational organizations established in 2004
Independent research institutes
Research institutes established in 2004
Education research institutes
Research institutes in Washington, D.C.
Think tanks established in 2004
Think tanks based in Washington, D.C.
Hispanic and Latino American